Tha Tako is a district (amphoe) in the eastern part of Nakhon Sawan province, central Thailand.

History
The district was established at Ban Khao Noi, Tambon Tha Tako, in 1900. At first there was confusion whether the name was Khao Noi or Don Kha. It got its official name Tha Tako in 1917.

In the past, the people in the district always visited a big river pier (in Thai tha) to bathe and give water to their cattle. At that pier several big Tako trees (Diospyros sp.) grew, so that pier was called Tha Tako.

Geography
Neighboring districts are (from the north clockwise): Nong Bua, Phaisali, Tak Fa, Phayuha Khiri, Mueang Nakhon Sawan, and Chum Saeng.

Administration
The district is divided into 10 sub-districts (tambons), which are further subdivided into 109 villages (mubans). Tha Tako is a township (thesaban tambon) which covers parts of tambon Tha Tako. There are a further 10 tambon administrative organizations (TAO).

References

Tha Tako